During the 2022 season Dinamo Batumi the club will be participating in the following competitions: Erovnuli Liga, Georgian Super Cup, UEFA Champions League, UEFA Europa Conference League.

Current squad
As of 14 July 2022 
Source

Competitions

Club Friendlies

Erovnuli Liga

Results summary

Results by round

Matches

Georgian Super Cup

UEFA Champions League

UEFA Europa Conference League

References

 https://uk.soccerway.com/teams/georgia/fc-dinamo-batumi/954/
 https://www.worldfootball.net/teams/dinamo-batumi/
 https://www.betexplorer.com/soccer/team/dinamo-batumi/ttw3Lxa4/

External links
 Official website 

FC Dinamo Batumi
Association football clubs 2022 season
2022 in Georgian football